Sir Francis Fox (29 June 1844 – 7 January 1927) was an English civil engineer, who was responsible for  the bridges over the Victoria Falls of the Zambesi and Sydney Harbour, the Mersey Railway Tunnel and the Liverpool Overhead Railway, and extending the London Underground. He was awarded a Knighthood by the King on 25 July 1912.

Biography
Born in Derby, England, he was one of three sons of the noted engineer and contractor Sir Charles Fox.

Educated at Highgate School, Brighton College and Tonbridge School, he entered into business with his father and his brother Charles Douglas in 1857. In 1860 the three formed a partnership, the firm being known as Sir Charles Fox and Sons. In 1871 he designed the Telescopic Bridge in Bridgwater.  Fox was also a consultant for the Simplon Tunnel and in 1878 constructed the replacement train shed at Bristol Temple Meads railway station. He became an engineer for the Great Central Railway and, in 1889, collaborated with his brother Douglas and H.W. Braddock in the construction of Marylebone station, London. He also assisted his brother in the construction of the Liverpool Overhead Railway, which was opened in 1893.

Fox also assisted in the shoring-up of several great cathedrals including St Paul's Cathedral and Winchester Cathedral in 1905, where he employed tie-rods and grouting to bind the walls together.

He married twice, in 1869 to Selena Wright who died in 1900, he then married Agnes Horne in 1901. Fox had a son and three daughters from his first marriage. In 1902, his daughter, Frances Emily married Reverend Walter Weston, the English clergyman and Anglican missionary who helped popularise recreational mountaineering in Japan. She accompanied Weston on many of his expeditions in the Japanese Alps.

References

Notes

External links
Francis Fox, How the Swiss Built the Greatest Tunnel in the World, 1905

1844 births
1927 deaths
People from Derby
People educated at Highgate School
English engineers
British bridge engineers